Barguna stadium is a multi-purpose stadium located in Barguna, Bangladesh.

See also
Stadiums in Bangladesh
List of cricket grounds in Bangladesh

References

Football venues in Bangladesh